American Vandal is an American mockumentary television series created by Dan Perrault and Tony Yacenda that premiered on September 15, 2017, on Netflix. The series is a parody of true crime documentaries such as Making a Murderer and Serial. On October 26, 2018, it was announced that Netflix had canceled the series after two seasons; however, it was also reported that producers intend to shop the program to other venues.

It received mostly positive critical reviews, was nominated for a Primetime Emmy Award, and won a Peabody Award.

Premise
The first season follows the aftermath of a costly high school prank that left 27 faculty cars vandalized with phallic images. Senior class clown Dylan Maxwell is accused of the crime by the school. He is expelled, but an investigation into the incident is launched by sophomore Peter Maldonado, with help from his friend Sam Ecklund, to uncover whether Dylan was the one truly behind the crime.

The second season follows Peter and Sam as they investigate a new crime at a Catholic private high school after their cafeteria's lemonade is contaminated with maltitol by someone calling themselves "The Turd Burglar."

Cast and characters

Main
 Tyler Alvarez as Peter Maldonado, the co-anchor of Hanover High School's morning show and the writer and director of true-crime documentary series American Vandal.
 Griffin Gluck as Sam Ecklund, a co-producer of American Vandal and Peter's closest friend.
 Jimmy Tatro as Dylan Maxwell (season 1), the primary suspect of the prank at Hanover High School.

Recurring

Season 1

 Joe Farrell as Jared Hixenbaugh
 Jessica Juarez as Brianna "Ganj" Gagne
 G. Hannelius as Christa Carlyle
 Camille Hyde as Gabi Granger
 Camille Ramsey as Mackenzie Wagner
 Eduardo Franco as Spencer Diaz
 Lukas Gage as Brandon Galloway
 Lou Wilson as Lucas Wiley
 Calum Worthy as Alex Trimboli
 Cody Wai-Ho Lee as Ming Zhang
 Saxon Sharbino as Sara Pearson
 P.L. Brown as Mr. Baxter
 Gabriela Fresquez as Sophia Gutierrez
 Ryan O'Flanagan as Steven "Kraz" Krazanski
Karly Rothenberg as Erin Shapiro
 Aylin Bayramoglu as Madison Kaplan
 Brian Perrault as Zack Rutherford

Season 2

 Travis Tope as Kevin McClain
 Melvin Gregg as DeMarcus Tillman
 Taylor Dearden as Chloe Lyman
 DeRon Horton as Lou Carter
 Adam Ray as Officer Crowder
 Sarah Burns as Ms. Angela Montgomery
 Jay Lee as Tanner Bassett
 Bellina Logan as Detective Carla Dickey
 Barbara Deering as Ms. Cathy Wexler
 Miles J. Harvey as Paul Schnorrenberg
 Jeremy Culhane as Grayson Wentz
 La'Charles Trask as Perry Coleman
 Susan Ruttan as Patricia McClain
 Jonathan Saks as Drew Pankratz
 Kiah Stern as Jenna Hawthorne
 Nathaniel J. Potvin as Trevor "Gonzo" Gonzalez
 Elisha Henig as Myles Crimmins
 Jeanine Jackson as Proud Nun
 Cayleb Long as "Hot Janitor"
 Connor Williams as Ethan Owens
 Matt Bennett as Gavin Landers
 Taylor Misiak as Abby Samuels
 Isaac Lamb as Matthew Gesualdi
 Luke Wyngarden as Nick Bradley

Episodes

Season 1 (2017)
{{Episode table |background=#990404 |overall=3 |season=3 |title=14 |director=7 |writer=10 |airdate=7 |country=US |released=y |episodes= 

{{Episode list
 |EpisodeNumber   = 5
 |EpisodeNumber2  = 5
 |Title           = Premature Theories
 |DirectedBy      = Tony Yacenda
 |WrittenBy       = Amy Pocha & Seth Cohen
 |OriginalAirDate = 
 |ShortSummary    = Peter goes back to Janson's house to get the voicemail from Janson's daughter, who angrily rips it up, having been annoyed about getting called nonstop by American Vandal'''s growing fandom. This causes Peter to look back at a previous party held at a student's grandmother's house—known colloquially as "Nana's Party"—using video footage from those involved, to find out if Dylan and his friends, who attended the party, mentioned about planning the phallic incident, with unsuccessful results. He instead finds evidence that debunks Trimboli's binge-drinking claim. He also notices a paint-spray can, used by Gabi's boyfriend Brandon Galloway on a towel as a promposal, that went missing afterward and later popped up on March 15 to be the drawing weapon. Peter reconciles with Sam after their fallout. With Gabi's help, Sam theorizes that there were three cars — belonging to Keene, physics teacher Mr. Maeda, and football coach Rafferty — hit with paint-spray splatter and deduces that the owners were the main targets, giving them a new lead on the case.
 |LineColor       = 990404
}}

}}

Season 2 (2018)

Production
Development
Creators Tony Yacenda and Dan Perrault sought to create a satire of true crime documentaries such as Serial, Making a Murderer, and The Jinx. Yacenda and Perrault came up with the idea for the show in early 2016 and subsequently pitched it to Netflix, which agreed to distribute the show after being assured that the show would be "more than just a dick joke sketch." Yacenda and Perrault, who had previously worked on short-form videos for outlets such as Funny or Die and CollegeHumor, were joined by showrunner Dan Lagana, who had most recently worked on the television series Deadbeat. Lagana took charge of hiring writers for the show, choosing individuals with relatively little experience in writing for television.

The creators developed the central mystery in the course of writing the show, and sought to strike a balance between humor and the creation of an engrossing mystery.

On August 3, 2017, it was announced that Netflix had ordered and produced a new mockumentary series entitled American Vandal and that it was set to premiere on September 15, 2017. The series was created by Tony Yacenda and Daniel Perrault who were set to executive produce alongside Dan Lagana, Joe Farrell, Ari Lubet, Josh Lieberman, and Michael Rotenberg. Lagana was expected to act as showrunner on the series as well. Production companies involved with the series include CBS Television Studios, Funny or Die and 3 Arts Entertainment.

Shortly after the release of the first season, Yacenda and Perrault discussed the possibility of a second season, with the same documentary crew creating a documentary on a different crime. On October 26, 2017, it was announced that Netflix had renewed the series for a second season. On August 21, 2018, it was announced that the second season would premiere on September 14, 2018. On October 26, 2018, it was announced that Netflix had canceled the series after two seasons, however it was also reported that producers intend to shop the program to other venues.

Casting
In casting the show, the creators avoided stunt casting, instead seeking actors who best fit the roles and had the ability to improvise. Alongside the initial series announcement, it was reported that the series' cast would include Tyler Alvarez, Jimmy Tatro, Griffin Gluck, Camille Hyde, Eduardo Franco, Jessica Juarez, Lou Wilson, Camille Ramsey, Calum Worthy, Lukas Gage and G Hannelius.

On March 14, 2018, it was announced that Travis Tope and Melvin Gregg had been cast in the series' lead roles for season two. On April 4, 2018, it was announced that Adam Ray had joined the cast in a recurring capacity. On June 14, 2018, Tony Yacenda, Dan Lagana, and Dan Perrault confirmed that Alvarez and Gluck would return as Peter and Sam, investigating a new crime in a Catholic high school. On August 21, 2018, it was announced that Taylor Dearden and DeRon Horton had joined the main cast of season two.

Release
On August 3, 2017, the official trailer for season one was released. On August 21, 2018, the official trailer for season two was released.

Reception
Critical response
Season 1
The first season of the series was met with critical acclaim upon release. On Rotten Tomatoes, the first season holds an approval rating of 98% based on 47 reviews, with an average rating of 8.34/10. The site's consensus reads, "American Vandal pays satirical dividends while also working as a genuinely absorbing mystery that offers thought-provoking commentary on modern entertainment." On Metacritic, the series has a weighted average score of 75 out of 100, based on reviews from 10 critics, indicating "generally favorable reviews".

Writing for The Ringer, Mark Titus praised the show's subtle humor, engrossing plot, and realistic representation of high school. Robert Lloyd of the Los Angeles Times described American Vandal as a "perfectly proportioned pastiche" of true crime documentaries. Steve Greene of IndieWire praised the "incredible sense of authenticity" in the performances and the series's exploration of the popularity of the true crime genre.

The series has also been praised for its attention to detail when depicting social media interactions. Writing for VICE, Shailee Koranne described American Vandal's portrayal of social media as "absolutely accurate and incredibly nuanced."American Vandal was honored with a Peabody Award for its first season on April 19, 2018. Calling it a "surprisingly insightful rumination on contemporary life... the show also offers a look at how the ethical questions of the true crime genre intersect with the harsh realities of being a teenager in the age of social media."

Season 2
On Rotten Tomatoes, the second season holds an approval rating of 98% on an average rating of 8.07 out of 10, based on 47 reviews. The site's consensus reads, "American Vandal'' trades one type of potty humor for another in an ambitious second season that manages to double down on the explicit gags while subtly addressing serious social issues." On Metacritic, the season received a weighted average score of 76 out of 100, based on reviews from 13 critics, indicating "generally favorable reviews".

Awards and nominations

References

External links

2010s American comedy-drama television series
2010s American crime drama television series
2010s American high school television series
2010s American mockumentary television series
2010s American satirical television series
2010s American teen drama television series
2017 American television series debuts
2018 American television series endings
English-language Netflix original programming
Television series about teenagers
Television series about filmmaking
Television series by 3 Arts Entertainment
Television series by CBS Studios
Television series by Funny or Die
Television series set in 2016
Television series set in 2017
Television series set in 2018
Television shows set in California
Television shows set in Washington (state)